The 3rd Canadian Folk Music Awards were held on December 1, 2007, at the Canadian Museum of Civilization in Gatineau, Quebec.

Nominees and recipients
Recipients are listed first and highlighted in boldface.

References

External links
Canadian Folk Music Awards

03
Canadian Folk Music Awards
Canadian Folk Music Awards
Canadian Folk Music Awards
Canadian Folk Music Awards